Daniel Webster Turner (March 17, 1877April 15, 1969) was an American Republican politician who served as the 25th Governor of Iowa from 1931 until 1933.

Biography
Daniel Webster Turner, named after the famed antebellum senator and orator, was born on a farm near Corning, Iowa. As a boy, he did farm chores and clerked at the general store owned by his father, a civil war veteran. Graduating from the Corning Academy in 1898, he enlisted in the Army and served in the Philippines during the Spanish–American War. He boxed in the division championship fights and won, but suffered a broken nose that became a permanent facial feature. Returning from the war, he joined the National Guard and rose to the rank of major. In 1903, at age 26, he was elected to the Iowa Senate. His political activism and boxer’s nose led the press to dub him, “Fighting Dan Turner.”

As a representative of the progressive wing of the Republican Party during the era of “prairie populism,” when the Midwest was a font of radicalism, Turner advocated for many reforms. In a 1912 address to the Republican State Convention, he defended the anti-trust law and called for direct election of U. S. senators, income and corporate taxes as more equitable than property taxes, and an end to corrupt leadership, saying, “We must cleanse our party of complacent plutocrats and corpulent freebooters, masquerading as Republicans.”  Elected to the Governorship in 1931, he attacked lobbyists in his inaugural address and demanded fair congressional districts, measures to promote child welfare, and establishing a state conservation commission:

“The professional lobbyist . . . should be ejected from the presence of honest men . . . . He is not interested in the well being of the people we represent.”

“Our streams are rapidly degenerating into open sewers, receiving the waste drainage of private industry and municipalities. We must terminate this practice.”

In a prelude to the Great Depression, the farming economy collapsed during the 1920s, with many related bank failures. Turner, as a "Son of the Wild Jackass" and one of four speakers at the Republican National Convention of 1928, urged the party to support farm relief. He traveled twice to Washington to unsuccessfully plead the same cause with President Hoover during the 1930s.

Governorship and Cow War
Turner played a decisive role in the Iowa Cow War of 1931. To keep people from contracting bovine tuberculosis, a State law mandated testing of dairy cows and destroying diseased animals. Farmers across Iowa responded with suspicion and hostility. When some banded together near Tipton, Iowa to prevent the tests from taking place and violence broke out,  Turner as governor restored peace by calling out the Iowa National Guard.  This act earned him the enmity of many farmers and may have contributed to his re-election defeat in 1932 by Democrat Clyde L. Herring, though this was the year of the Roosevelt-led Democratic sweep, when Republicans were removed from office nationwide.

Later years
Returning to the race for governor of Iowa in 1934, Turner was defeated a second time by Herring.  He did not run for office again but remained active in politics. He supported fellow Republican Dwight Eisenhower in the presidential race of 1952, but turned against Eisenhower after a meeting with the President yielded disappointment on farm-related matters. In the election of 1956, he crossed party lines and supported Democrat Adlai Stevenson for president. Still advocating for farmers’ interests at age 78, he was active in founding the National Farmers Organization, recalling Thomas Jefferson when he cited the “yeoman farmer, who has been the bulwark of our nation.”

At the end of his life, remembering his part in the Spanish–American War, Turner was heard to say, “They gave us the Springfield rifle. I wish I had never learned to shoot it. They said we were fighting for liberty, but it was cruel, it was cruel.”  He died in Corning at age 92 and is buried there in Walnut Grove Cemetery.

Notable Relatives
Singer-songwriter Glen Phillips of Toad The Wet Sprocket is a great-great-nephew of Gov. Turner.

References

People from Adams County, Iowa
American people of the Spanish–American War
Military personnel from Iowa
1877 births
1969 deaths
Republican Party Iowa state senators
Republican Party governors of Iowa
Burials in Iowa
20th-century American politicians